The 1991–92 Segunda División was the 43rd season of the Mexican Segunda División. The season started on 16 August 1991 and concluded on 14 June 1992. It was won by Pachuca.

As of this season, the system to define the champion changed, the two-group system was eliminated and they began to play in the Playoff format, starting in the quarterfinals.

Changes 
 Atlante was promoted to Primera División.
 Irapuato was relegated from Primera División.
 Ayense, SUOO and Atlético Cuernavaca were promoted from Segunda División B.
 Deportivo Celaya was promoted from Tercera División.
 Guerreros Acapulco, Cachorros Zamora, Leones Saltillo and Zitlaltepec were relegated from Segunda División.
 Atlético Potosino sold its franchise, the new owners moved the team to Tampico and Ciudad Madero, the team was renamed as Tampico Madero.
 Jalisco was relocated in Acapulco and renamed as Delfines de Acapulco due to owners change.
 Ecatepec sold its franchise to Universidad Tecnológica de Nezahualcóyotl, the team was relocated at Ciudad Nezahualcóyotl and renamed as UTN.

Teams

Group stage

Group 1

Group 2

Group 3

Group 4

Results

Promotion play-offs

Final

References 

1991–92 in Mexican football
Segunda División de México seasons